The Modesto International Architecture Festival was an architecture festival.

History 
In 2008 the American Institute of Architects Sierra Valley Chapter (AIASV) founded the “AIA Sierra Valley Film Festival” in collaboration with the Modesto Art Museum, the State Theatre, and the Modesto Film Society. Bob Barzan, executive director of the Modesto Art Museum, approached the Modesto Film Society, State Theatre and AIA Sierra Valley to see if they were interested in partnering with the museum for an architectural film event. The four organizations got together and planned the first event. The festival became an ongoing event featuring 4 architectural film nights throughout the year. From 2008 to 2012 the festival grew to incorporate new events, incorporating lectures, exhibits, tours and special events.  

In 2010 the festival received its new name "The Modesto International Architecture Festival". The festival was open to submissions by independent film makers from around the world.

Past Films 

2008

 The Fountainhead
 Metropolis
 Sketches of Frank Gehry
 Greening of Southie

2009

 Maya Lin: A Strong Clear Vision
 Architect of Dreams (AUDIENCE FAVORITE AWARD WINNER)
 Angle of Inspiration

2010

 Aqua Tower
 Rick Joy: Interludes (AUDIENCE FAVORITE AWARD WINNER)
 A Girl is a Fellow Here
 Columbus, Indiana: Unexpected, Unforgettable
 Jonathan Segal: Design + Build + Sustain
 Sprawlanta
 Building Imagination: Wealth
 Make No Little Plans: Daniel Burnham and the American City
 Visual Acoustics: The Modernism of Julius Shulman

2011

 Peter Stutchbury, Architecture of Place
 Subversive Architects
 A Plea for Modernism
 So What
 Morris Lapidus: Architect | Icon | American Original
 Portland: A Sense of Place (AUDIENCE FAVORITE AWARD WINNER)

2012

 Daeyang Gallery and House: A Conversation with Steven Holl  (AUDIENCE FAVORITE AWARD WINNER)
 Alone and Desired
 Village Architect
 Daniel Libeskind : Artist Series
 Second Nature : A Documentary Film About Janne Saario
 Hedonistic Sustainability

External links 
 Modesto International Architecture Festival
 AIA Sierra Valley
 Modesto Art Museum

References 

Architecture film festivals
Film festivals in California